Thomas Benedict (1682–July 5, 1763)  was a member of the House of Representatives of the Colony of Connecticut from Norwalk in the sessions of May 1737, October 1740, and October 1744. He was chosen as selectman at least seven times, and was moderator of the town meetings not less than ten times.

He was the son of John Benedict and Phoebe Gregory.

He held a military position for most of his life, and was named a captain in 1746. It is recorded that his voice could be heard and understood at the distance of more than a mile.

References 

1682 births
1763 deaths
Connecticut city council members
Members of the Connecticut House of Representatives
Politicians from Norwalk, Connecticut